Protea lorifolia, in English called the strap-leaved sugarbush, strap-leaved protea or strap-leaf sugarbush is a flowering shrub which belongs to the genus Protea. 

In Afrikaans this species is known by the vernacular name of riemblaar-suikerbos.

The tree's national number is 91.

Taxonomy
Protea lorifolia was first described as Erodendrum lorifolium by Richard Anthony Salisbury in the 1809 work ostensibly authored by the gardener Joseph Knight titled On the cultivation of the plants belonging to the natural order of Proteeae. It was moved to the genus Protea by Henry Georges Fourcade in 1932.

Description
The compact, round-shaped shrub grows up to three metres in height, and blooms from April to October. The plant is monoecious with both sexes in each flower.

Distribution
The plant is endemic to the Cape Provinces of South Africa. Its distribution covers a wide area, from the Koue Bokkeveld Mountains through the Swartberg, Riviersonderend and Langeberg Mountains, to the Baviaanskloofberge and Kouga Mountains. It can be seen near the towns of Makhanda and Riebeek East, and on the Boschberg mountain in Somerset East.

Ecology
Potential wildfires destroy the adult plants, but the seeds can survive such events, being safely stored in a cap. The seeds are eventually dispersed by means of the wind. Pollination occurs through the action of birds. The plant grows on dry slopes in sandstone-derived soils, and is found at altitudes of 450 to 1,400 metres.

Conservation
It is not threatened.

References

lorifolia
Flora of South Africa